The 83rd Grey Cup a.k.a. The Wind Bowl was the 1995 Canadian Football League championship game played between the Baltimore Stallions and the Calgary Stampeders at Taylor Field in Regina, Saskatchewan. The Stallions won the game by a score of 37–20.  It marked the only time that an American-based team won the Grey Cup.

Game summary
Baltimore Stallions (37) - TDs, Chris Wright, Alvin Walton, Tracy Ham; FGs, Carlos Huerta (5); cons., Huerta (3); singles, Josh Miller (1).

Calgary Stampeders (20) - TDs, Marvin Pope, Doug Flutie; FGs, Mark McLoughlin (2); cons., McLoughlin (2).

First Quarter
BAL - TD Wright 82-yard punt return (Huerta convert) 2:26
CAL - FG McLoughlin 35-yard field goal 7:19
CAL - FG McLoughlin 32-yard field goal 14:21
Second Quarter
CAL - TD Pope 2-yard pass from Flutie (McLoughlin convert) 0:39
BAL - FG Huerta 30-yard field goal 2:51
BAL - TD Walton 4-yard fumble return (Huerta convert) 7:21
BAL - FG Huerta 45-yard field goal 9:49
BAL - FG Huerta 53-yard field goal 13:30
Third Quarter
BAL - Single Miller 70-yard punt through end zone 1:06
CAL - TD Flutie 1-yard run (McLoughlin convert) 7:58
BAL - TD Ham 13-yard run (Huerta convert) 12:47
Fourth Quarter
BAL - FG Huerta 41-yard field goal 7:29
BAL - FG Huerta 18-yard field goal 13:40

The winds at Taylor Field were particularly strong and gusted up to 85 km/h (50 mph) during the game. Indeed, they were so strong that CFL officials seriously considered postponing the game to the following night. They feared that the temporary stands built at one end at the stadium would not be safe.

The Stallions opened the game with a Grey Cup record 82-yard punt return by Chris Wright just 2:20 into the game.  Calgary responded scoring the next 13 points, including a rare touchdown for Marvin Pope on a three-yard pass from Doug Flutie early in the second quarter giving the Stampeders a 13-7 lead.

Baltimore responded with four consecutive scores including three Carlos Huerta field goals against the wind, the longest from a Grey Cup record 53 yards. O. J. Brigance blocked a Tony Martino punt with just under eight minutes to go in the half which was scooped up by Alvin Walton at the five. He dove over for Baltimore's lone touchdown of the half.
In the third quarter after a Baltimore single, Flutie scored a touchdown on a one-yard plunge but it was the last scoring for Calgary. Stallions quarterback Tracy Ham responded with a touchdown of his own and Huerta kicked two field goals to round out Baltimore's scoring.

Trivia
Tracy Ham was named the game's Most Valuable Player. Ham threw for 213 yards and rushed for a touchdown. Stamps slotback Dave Sapunjis was the game's outstanding Canadian hauling in eight passes for 113 yards.

Stallions linebacker O.J. Brigance would later win Super Bowl XXXV on January 28, 2001 as a member of the National Football League's Baltimore Ravens, becoming the only football player in history to ever win a Grey Cup and a Super Bowl with teams based out of the same city.

This was the first Grey Cup to be played in the province of Saskatchewan.

Shortly after the season, the Cleveland Browns announced they were moving to Baltimore.  Knowing he could not compete with an NFL team, Stallions owner Jim Speros opted to cancel his franchise and used his organization and players as the basis for reactivating the dormant Montreal Alouettes franchise.  As a result, the Stallions along with the Ottawa Rough Riders, are officially the only Grey Cup champions in the modern era to fold.

It also marked the final time "The Star-Spangled Banner" was sung before the Grey Cup game (before the customary playing of "O Canada"), or any CFL game as the CFL ceased its American operations after the end of the season. However, "The Star-Spangled Banner" was sung at the 89th Grey Cup in 2001 (in mark of respect of lives lost due to the 9/11 attacks).

1995 CFL Playoffs

North Division
 Semi-final (November 4 @ Calgary, Alberta) Calgary Stampeders 30-13 Hamilton Tiger-Cats
 Semi-final (November 5 @ Edmonton, Alberta) Edmonton Eskimos 26-15 BC Lions
 Final (November 12 @ Calgary, Alberta) Calgary Stampeders 37-4 Edmonton Eskimos

South Division
 Semi-final (November 4 @ Baltimore, Maryland) Baltimore Stallions 36-21 Winnipeg Blue Bombers
 Semi-final (November 5 @ San Antonio, Texas) San Antonio Texans 52-9 Birmingham Barracudas
 Final (November 12 @ Baltimore, Maryland) Baltimore Stallions 21-11 San Antonio Texans

External links
 

Grey Cup
Grey Cup
Grey Cups hosted in Regina, Saskatchewan
Grey C
Calgary Stampeders
Baltimore Stallions
1995 in Canadian television
November 1995 sports events in Canada